Cathedral Church of St. Luke may refer to:

 Cathedral Church of St. Luke (Orlando, Florida)
 Cathedral Church of St. Luke (Portland, Maine)